Ciro's, often written Ciros, was an exclusive nightclub in Orange Street, Leicester Square, London, "just behind the National Gallery". It was famously closed during WWI for serving alcohol illegally. A fashionable club of the same name later opened at the same location.

History
Little has been found of the early days of the establishment. The producer Jack Haskell staged a cabaret there around 1912, and said that an evening's entertainment at Ciro's would cost at least £10/10.

The club came to public attention in 1916 when it lost its licence after a police raid at 11pm on Sunday 19 November 1916. It was proved they were serving jugs of champagne (sold as "special ginger beer") after hours, and to non-members.   This was in the depths of the War, when butter was rationed and petrol unobtainable. A workers' newspaper commented:... if that's the way to win the war, and denotes a burning enthusiasm, the Tory press is right; Australia hasn't been doing her best, for she has scarcely got past beer by the jugful.The two managers were each fined £125 and three directors were fined £25 each, with costs.

By 1921 a club of that name had opened in London, and was frequented by the fashionable and well-to-do.

Notes and references 

Nightclubs in London